Dunans Bridge is a category A-listed structure, designed by Thomas Telford. It is located at Dunans Castle on the Cowal peninsula in Argyll, Scotland. It was built for John Fletcher of Dunans, to commemorate the battle of Waterloo. The bridge was completed in 1815, and predates the 1864 elaboration of Dunans House by Kerr into a Franco-Baronial "castle". The three-arched rubble construction is considered internationally important as it is the only extant bridge of this type. It was built to replace the now destroyed "swing bridge". Though it is of a kind often constructed by Telford, the three arches, gargoyles and eight hexagonal piers, as well as its sheer height , make it unique.

The structure is in the "At Risk" category on the Buildings at Risk Register for Scotland. The 2008 inspection indicated: "there is significant vegetation growth on and around the structure and the buttress caps have been damaged by cement repairs."

References

Category A listed buildings in Argyll and Bute
Listed bridges in Scotland
Bridges completed in 1815
Bridges by Thomas Telford
Kilmodan
Glendaruel
Clan Fletcher
Buildings at Risk Register for Scotland
Bridges in Argyll and Bute
1815 establishments in Scotland